Shapur-i Shahrvaraz (meaning "Shapur, son of Shahrvaraz"), also known as Shapur V,  was Sasanian king (shah) of Iran briefly in 630.

Biography
Shapur-i Shahrvaraz was the son of Shahrbaraz, the distinguished Iranian military commander (spahbed) and briefly shah of Iran. Shapur's mother was the sister of Khosrow II. In 630, after Boran was deposed, Shapur became king of Iran, but was shortly deposed by the nobles who did not acknowledge his rule. He was succeeded by his cousin Azarmidokht. When she became queen of Iran, Farrukh Hormizd proposed to marry her, which Shapur was in favor of; however, Azarmidokht declined the proposal and became angry at Shapur for agreeing. What happened to Shapur afterward is not known.

References

Sources 

Year of death unknown
7th-century Sasanian monarchs
Year of birth unknown
House of Mihran